Jacques De Coster (5 January 1945 – 11 November 2022) was a Belgian politician of the Socialist Party. First working as a teacher, he served in the Parliament of the Brussels-Capital Region from 1989 to 1999 and again from 2005 to 2009.

De Coster died in Woluwe-Saint-Lambert on 11 November 2022, at the age of 77.

References

1945 births
2022 deaths
Socialist Party (Belgium) politicians
Members of the Parliament of the Brussels-Capital Region
People from Etterbeek